Daley's Ferry Post was a California Volunteer post at the Daley's Ferry crossing of the Mad River nearly three miles from the town of Arcata in Humboldt County. It was established by the following order to Captain E. B. Gibbs, Company E, 2nd California Infantry Regiment at Camp Curtis likely in response to an attack on the Ferry in June 1862:

Later in March 1863, the post was ordered reduced in strength:

Company C, left Camp Curtis in May 1863, apparently not being replaced by Company C, 1st Battalion California Volunteer Mountaineers until they were mustered in at Camp Curtis on August 29, 1863. The post is not referred to in Department correspondence after March 1863 and so presumably was abandoned by May of that year.

References

  The California State Military Museum, Historic California Posts: Daby's Ferry Post
  The War of the Rebellion: Volume 35, Part 1 CORRESPONDENCE, ORDERS, AND RETURNS RELATING TO OPERATIONS ON THE PACIFIC COAST FROM JULY 1, 1862, TO JUNE 30, 1865. By United States. War Dept, Robert Nicholson Scott, Henry Martyn WASHINGTON: GOVERNMENT PRINTING OFFICE, 1897. pp.277, 357 
 The War of the Rebellion: a Compilation of the Official Records of the Union and Confederate Armies Series I Volume L Part I Page 68 of 1173 - Operations on the Pacific Coast

History of Humboldt County, California
Former populated places in California
Closed installations of the United States Army
California in the American Civil War
American Civil War army posts
Bald Hills War
1862 establishments in California